Filip Michał Bajon (born 25 August 1947) is a Polish film director and screenwriter.

Selected filmography

References

External links
 

1947 births
Living people
Film people from Poznań
Polish film directors
Polish screenwriters